Thecla letha, the Watson's hairstreak, is a small butterfly found in India that belongs to the lycaenids or blues family.

Range
The butterfly occurs in India in Assam and extends to the Chin Hills and southern Shan states in Myanmar.

See also
List of butterflies of India (Lycaenidae)

Cited references

References
 
 
 
 

Thecla (butterfly)
Butterflies of Asia
Butterflies described in 1896